"Breakdown" is the first single from Tom Petty and the Heartbreakers' self-titled debut album. It became a Top 40 hit in the United States and Canada.

Played live, Petty sometimes incorporated "Breakdown" with Ray Charles's "Hit the Road Jack". A live recording of this variation appears on The Live Anthology.

Background 
"Breakdown" was a song written and recorded for the band's debut album. Initially, the song had lead guitarist Mike Campbell with a distinct guitar lick being played only near the end of the song. While playing it back one night, Tom Petty and Dwight Twilley, a friend of Phil Seymour, were in the studio, and Twilley enjoyed it. He suggested that the lick should be used throughout the song, and Petty obliged. At 2 AM, he gathered the Heartbreakers to join him in re-recording the song. Their final take was seven to eight minutes long, but it was pared down to 2 minutes and 39 seconds on the album. Guests on the song's recording include guitarist Jeff Jourard, a common collaborator with the band in their early days, and Phil Seymour, who sings backing vocals.

Reception
Record World called it a "slow, sultry rocker, dominated by guitar, with Petty's distinctive vocal again standing out."

Track listing
7" Single (US, 1976)
A. "Breakdown" – 2:39 
B. "The Wild One, Forever" – 3:01

7" Single (US, 1977)
A. "Breakdown" – 2:39
B. "Fooled Again (I Don't Like It)" – 3:54

7" Single (Germany, 1977)
A. "Breakdown" – 2:42
B. "Luna" – 3:59

7" Single (Spain, 1978)
A. "Breakdown" – 2:42
B. "Strangered in the Night" – 3:32

Chart performance

Album appearances
Tom Petty and the Heartbreakers (1976)
FM (1978)
Pack Up the Plantation: Live! (1985)
Greatest Hits (1993)Playback (1995)Anthology: Through the Years (2000)Mojo Tour 2010 (2010)

Grace Jones version

Jamaican singer Grace Jones recorded a reggae-inflected version of the song on her 1980 album Warm Leatherette''. Petty wrote a third verse of the song specifically for Jones to record; "It's OK if you must go / I'll understand if you don't / You say goodbye right now / I'll still survive somehow / Why should we let this drag on?" The song was edited from its full, 5:30 album version to a 3-minute-long track on single release. It was released as a US-only single in July 1980 but did not chart.

Track listing
7" single
A. "Breakdown" – 3:00
B. "Warm Leatherette" – 4:24

12" single
A. "Breakdown" – 5:30
B1. "Breakdown" (edit) – 3:10
B2. "Warm Leatherette" – 4:24

7" promotional single
A. "Breakdown" (stereo edit) – 3:00
B. "Breakdown" (mono edit) – 3:00

References

1977 debut singles
1980 singles
Grace Jones songs
Tom Petty songs
American soul songs
Songs written by Tom Petty
1976 songs
Island Records singles
Shelter Records singles
Song recordings produced by Denny Cordell